Homer Curry (May 19, 1905 – March 30, 1974), nicknamed "Goose", was an American Negro league outfielder and manager from the 1920s to the 1940s.

A native of Mexia, Texas, Curry made his Negro leagues debut in 1928 with the Cleveland Tigers. He went on to have a 20-year Negro league playing career, and also managed the Memphis Red Sox and Philadelphia Stars. Curry died in Memphis, Tennessee in 1974 at age 68.

References

External links
 and Baseball-Reference Black Baseball stats and Seamheads
 

1905 births
1974 deaths
Baltimore Elite Giants players
Cleveland Tigers (baseball) players
Indianapolis Athletics players
Kansas City Monarchs players
Memphis Red Sox players
Monroe Monarchs players
Nashville Elite Giants players
Negro league baseball managers
New York Black Yankees players
Philadelphia Stars players
Washington Elite Giants players
Baseball outfielders
Baseball players from Texas
People from Mexia, Texas
20th-century African-American sportspeople